The ECAC Hockey Student-Athlete of the Year is an annual award given out at the conclusion of the ECAC Hockey regular season to the top scholar-athlete in the conference as voted by the coaches of each ECAC team. Each team nominates a candidate based upon their academic and athletic achievements who then become eligible for the conference award.

The Student-Athlete of the Year was first awarded in 2007 and every year thereafter.

Award winners

Winners by school

Winners by position

See also
ECAC Hockey Awards

References

General

Specific

External links
ECAC Hockey Awards (Incomplete)

ECAC Hockey
College ice hockey trophies and awards in the United States
ECAC
Awards established in 2007